Roy Charman (31 May 1930 – 4 October 1990) was an English sound engineer. He won an Academy Award for Best Sound and was nominated for three more in the same category.

Selected filmography
Charman won an Academy Award and was nominated for three more:

Won
 Raiders of the Lost Ark (1981)

Nominated
 The Wind and the Lion (1975)
 Superman (1978)
 Aliens (1986)

References

External links

1930 births
1990 deaths
English audio engineers
Best Sound Mixing Academy Award winners